Franck Dumas (born 9 January 1968) is a French football coach and former player who manages TP Mazembe. He played as a defender.

Playing career
Dumas was born in Bayeux, Calvados. He started his career at Stade Malherbe Caen and played there for five seasons before moving to AS Monaco. Dumas played in Jean Tigana's talented Monaco side which famously put Manchester United out of the Champions League in 1998 on away goals after a 1–1 draw at Old Trafford. He was also a key part of the side that won the 1996–97 Ligue 1 title.

Dumas joined Newcastle United in England in July 1999 before moving back to France to join Olympique de Marseille in January 2000.

Managerial career
Dumas later returned to Caen where he continued playing until his retirement in 2004, and where he would later manage.

In August 2014, Dumas was appointed as manager of Moroccan Botola side MAS Fez, on a one-year contract.

Tax evasion
In January 2017, Dumas was sentenced in first instance to three years of jail including ten months suspended by the French Tribunal of Caen for tax evasion, after a complaint from the French taxation authority to which he owed €557,496. The sentence was suspended after the judge heard Dumas' plea for mitigation which cited a gambling addiction and an "impossibly difficult" business situation.

References

External links
 
 

1968 births
Living people
People from Bayeux
Sportspeople from Calvados (department)
French footballers
Footballers from Normandy
Association football defenders
Stade Malherbe Caen players
AS Monaco FC players
Premier League players
Newcastle United F.C. players
Olympique de Marseille players
RC Lens players
Ligue 1 players
Ligue 2 players
French football managers
Stade Malherbe Caen managers
Ligue 1 managers
AC Arlésien managers
Maghreb de Fès managers
CA Bordj Bou Arréridj managers
CR Belouizdad managers
TP Mazembe managers
French expatriate footballers
French expatriate football managers
French expatriate sportspeople in England
Expatriate footballers in England
French expatriate sportspeople in the Democratic Republic of the Congo
Expatriate football managers in the Democratic Republic of the Congo